The posterior median sulcus of medulla oblongata (or posterior median fissure or dorsal median sulcus) is a narrow groove; and exists only in the closed part of the medulla oblongata; it becomes gradually shallower from below upward, and finally ends about the middle of the medulla oblongata, where the central canal expands into the cavity of the fourth ventricle.

Additional images

References 

Medulla oblongata